Michele Pellizzer (born 22 May 1989) is an Italian footballer who plays as a central defender for  club Virtus Entella.

Club career
Born in Asolo, Pellizzer made his senior debuts with Bassano Virtus in Serie C2. In the 2009–10 season he was a part of the squad who won promotion, and after being regularly used in the following season he joined Cittadella.

On 27 August 2011 Pellizzer made his Serie B debut, starting in a 2–1 home win over AlbinoLeffe; his first goal only came on 1 December 2012, netting his side's only of a 1–1 draw at Juve Stabia.

In July 2013, Pellizzer became the captain at Cittadella replacing former captain Alex Cordaz.

References

Virtus Entella, acquistati a titolo definitivo bomber Caputo e Pellizzer, picenotime.it, 23 June 2016

External links

1989 births
Living people
People from Asolo
Sportspeople from the Province of Verona
Italian footballers
Association football defenders
Serie A players
Serie B players
Serie C players
Lega Pro Seconda Divisione players
Bassano Virtus 55 S.T. players
A.S. Cittadella players
Virtus Entella players
Footballers from Veneto
Sportspeople from the Province of Treviso